Notre-Dame-de-Lorette is a municipality in the Canadian province of Quebec, located within the regional county municipality of Maria-Chapdelaine. With a population of 159 in the Canada 2021 Census, it is the least populated and northernmost municipality in the Saguenay–Lac-Saint-Jean region.

Demographics
Population trend:
 Population in 2021: 159 (2016 to 2021 population change: -15.9%)
 Population in 2016: 189 
 Population in 2011: 189 
 Population in 2006: 175
 Population in 2001: 216
 Population in 1996: 234
 Population in 1991: 258

Private dwellings occupied by usual residents: 92 (total dwellings: 116)

Mother tongue:
 English as first language: 0%
 French as first language: 96.9%
 English and French as first language: 0%
 Other as first language: 0%

References

Municipalities in Quebec
Incorporated places in Saguenay–Lac-Saint-Jean
Maria-Chapdelaine Regional County Municipality